Angel is a song written by Jerry Burns and Sally Herbert sung by English singer-songwriter Sarah Brightman from her eleventh studio album, Dreamchaser. It was first released as the album's lead single in Europe and Mexico as a digital download on October 15, 2012.
The song was originally sung by Sally Herbert in 2001 and was included in the soundtrack to the film Crush, starring Andie MacDowell.

Music video
A music video to accompany the release of "Angel" was first released onto YouTube on October 10, 2012 at a total length of four minutes and thirty-one seconds. It was made available for download on October 30, 2012.

The music video consists of Brightman's childhood home videos, some clips from the old cartoons and new scenes as well.

Track listing

Release history

References

External links
 Sarah Brightman official website

Sarah Brightman songs
2012 singles
2001 songs
Song recordings produced by Mike Hedges